Prima Tower Revolving Restaurant is a Chinese restaurant in Singapore owned and managed by Prima Tower Pte Ltd. 

The restaurant opened in 1977, and was touted for being the "world’s only revolving restaurant nestled on a grain silo". It also serves Beijing cuisine, together with views of Sentosa, Mount Faber and the Cable Car.

History 
The restaurant was built on top of a grain silo. 

It was popular as a wedding venue for Chinese couples, offering wedding banquets and packages

Closure 
On 6 April 2020, the restaurant closed due to the Circuit Breaker measures implemented by Singapore. Although scheduled to open on 1 August, it was closed permanently, after 43 years in operation.

Mr Jian Yongyao, chairman of the restaurant, stated that it was a difficult decision to close the restaurant and "It's a shame that a 43-year-old business has come to this".

External links 
Prima Tower Website (archived)

Prima Tower Alternative Website (archived)

References 

1977 establishments in Singapore
2020 disestablishments in Singapore